By-elections to the 43rd Canadian Parliament were held to fill vacancies in the House of Commons of Canada between the 2019 federal election and the 2021 federal election. The 43rd Canadian Parliament has existed since 2019 with the membership of its House of Commons having been determined by the results of the Canadian federal election held on October 21, 2019. The Liberal Party of Canada had a minority government during this Parliament.

Two by-elections were held on October 26, 2020 due to the resignation of Finance Minister Bill Morneau (Liberal, Toronto Centre) on August 17, 2020 to run for Secretary-General of the OECD, and the resignation of Michael Levitt (Liberal, York Centre) effective September 1, 2020 to become the President and CEO of the Canadian Friends of Simon Wiesenthal Centre for Holocaust Studies.

A third by-election was pending in the riding of Haldimand—Norfolk following the resignation of Conservative MP Diane Finley on May 20, 2021, but was cancelled due to the 2021 Canadian federal election being called for September 20, 2021.

The writ for a by-election must be dropped no sooner than 11 days and no later than 180 days after the Chief Electoral Officer is officially notified of a vacancy via a warrant issued by the Speaker. Under the Canada Elections Act, the minimum length of a campaign is 36 days between dropping the writ and election day.

Overview

October 26, 2020 by-elections

Scheduling 
Prime Minister Justin Trudeau announced both by-elections on Friday September 18, along with Liberal candidates for each riding. Annamie Paul, the newly elected leader of the Green Party and Green candidate for Toronto Centre, called on the government to delay the by-elections, citing increased restrictions on movement and activity in Toronto in light of rising cases of COVID-19. Trudeau rejected changing the schedule, saying that the by-elections have to be held within a certain time period of the seats becoming vacant, and that the pandemic may be worse later in the year. Any changes to by-election dates would be approved by the cabinet, but would have to first be proposed by the independent Chief Electoral Officer. Paul responded by calling on parliament to pass new legislation – proposed by Elections Canada – that would give the agency more flexibility to respond to the pandemic.

Toronto Centre

The riding of Toronto Centre was vacated on August 17, 2020 following the resignation of Liberal MP and Minister of Finance Bill Morneau to seek election as Secretary General of the OECD Morneau had represented the riding since 2015, while the Liberals have held the riding since 1988.

Note: Candidates' names are as registered with Elections Canada.

York Centre

The riding of York Centre became vacant on September 1, 2020, when Liberal MP Michael Levitt resigned to become the president and CEO of the Canadian Friends of Simon Wiesenthal Centre for Holocaust Studies. The riding had been held by Levitt since 2015, when he won the riding from Conservative incumbent Mark Adler.

By September 7, five candidates had launched their campaigns for the Liberal nomination including 2019 Thornhill candidate Gary Gladstone, former chief fundraiser of the provincial Ontario Liberal Fund, Bobby Walman, as well as former Canadian Jewish News editor Yoni Goldstein. It was announced on September 17 that communications specialist Ya'ara Saks would be appointed as the Liberal candidate.

Rumoured candidates for the Conservative nomination included 2019 candidate Rachel Willson, York Centre MPP Roman Baber, and former parliamentary staffer Melissa Lantsman; they all declined. Wilson announced on September 18 that she would not be running. The Conservatives ultimately nominated Julius Tiangson, who previously ran for the party in Mississauga Centre in 2015.

The NDP candidate, Andrea Vásquez Jiménez, previously ran for the seat in the 2019 election.

People's Party of Canada leader Maxime Bernier said he intended to run in either the Toronto Centre or York Centre by-election. Bernier decided he would run in York Centre when the by-elections were announced.

Perennial candidate John "The Engineer" Turmel registered as an Independent candidate.

The Speaker's warrant regarding the vacancy was received on September 1, 2020; under the Parliament of Canada Act the writ for a by-election had to be dropped no later than February 28, 2021, 180 days after the Chief Electoral Officer was officially notified of the vacancy via a warrant issued by the Speaker. Under the Canada Elections Act, the minimum length of a campaign is 36 days between dropping the writ and election day.

Note: Candidates' names are as registered with Elections Canada.

Cancelled by-election

Haldimand—Norfolk
The riding of Haldimand—Norfolk had been vacant effective May 20, 2021 following the resignation of Conservative MP Diane Finley announced on May 11, 2021. The riding had been held by Finley since it was created in 2004.

The date of the by-election had to be announced between May 31, 2021 and November 16, 2021. However, the by-election was cancelled and replaced by the federal election which was called on August 15 to be held on September 20.

Prior to Finley's resignation, lawyer and 2020 Conservative leadership candidate Leslyn Lewis had been nominated as the party's candidate in the constituency for the next federal election, while Karen Matthews had been nominated as the Liberal candidate.

See also
List of federal by-elections in Canada

Notes

References

2019 elections in Canada
43rd
43rd Canadian Parliament